Cielos Airlines, commonly known by its old name Cielos del Peru S.A., was a cargo airline based in Callao, Peru. It operated scheduled, ad hoc and contract charter domestic and international cargo services. Its main base was Jorge Chávez International Airport.

History
The airline was established in 1997 and started operations in 1998 with a Boeing 707. On January 31, 1998, Export Air was merged into the company after Cielos acquired its outstanding stock. It was owned by Alfonso Conrado Rey (70%), Francisco Berniwson (15%) and Manuel Eduardo Francesqui Navarro (15%). The fleet grew to a total of 8 aircraft at the end of 2006.

Destinations

Cielos Airlines operated freight services to the following international scheduled destinations (as of June 2006):

Buenos Aires (Ministro Pistarini International Airport)
San Miguel de Tucumán (Teniente Benjamín Matienzo International Airport)

Campinas (Viracopos International Airport)
Manaus (Eduardo Gomes International Airport)
São Paulo (Guarulhos International Airport)

Santiago (Arturo Merino Benítez International Airport)

Barranquilla (Ernesto Cortissoz International Airport)
Bogotá (El Dorado International Airport)
Cali (Alfonso Bonilla Aragón International Airport)
Medellín (José María Córdova International Airport)

Santo Domingo (Las Américas International Airport)

Guayaquil (José Joaquín de Olmedo International Airport)
Quito (Old Mariscal Sucre International Airport)

Guatemala City (La Aurora International Airport)

Guadalajara (Don Miguel Hidalgo y Costilla International Airport)
Mexico City (Mexico City International Airport)

Panama City (Tocumen International Airport)

Lima (Jorge Chávez International Airport) Hub

Los Angeles (Los Angeles International Airport)
Miami (Miami International Airport) Hub
New York City (John F. Kennedy International Airport)

Montevideo (Carrasco International Airport)

Caracas (Simón Bolívar International Airport)
Valencia (Arturo Michelena International Airport)

Fleet
The Cielos Airlines fleet included the following aircraft (at March 2012, three months prior to closure):

Retired fleet
Before closing, the airline previously operated the following aircraft:

The aircraft of Cielos' fleet were christened Petete, Petete II, Petete III, etc. The aircraft were named after (the nickname of) the airline owner's son, with Petete meaning pacifier in the owner's local language.

Accidents and incidents
On July 6, 2003, a McDonnell Douglas DC-10-30CF (registered OB-1749) skidded off Runway 33 of Alfonso Bonilla Aragón International Airport on landing, and came to rest 300 meters past the end of the runway. The aircraft sustained damage to engine no. 1 and main landing gear after colliding with ILS antennas. All 4 occupants on board survived. The aircraft was repaired and returned to service.

References

External links

 

Defunct airlines of Peru
Latin American and Caribbean Air Transport Association
Airlines established in 1997
Airlines disestablished in 2012
Cargo airlines